The Amelia Cottage Museum, sometimes referred to as Miss Amelia's Cottage & Roy Lester Carriage House, on Montauk Highway in Amagansett, New York, is operated by the Amagansett Historical Association as a museum of family life in Amagansett over three centuries. The house was built in 1725 for Catherine Schellinger and moved to its current location in 1794. The last known occupant, Mary Amelia Schellinger, was born in the house in 1841 and lived there until about a year before she died in 1930. Thirty Schellinger children are believed to have been born in this house.

It was added to the National Register of Historic Places in 1994.

References

External links
Amagansett Historic Sites and East Hampton Village Historic District (East Hampton Chamber of Commerce)

Museums in Suffolk County, New York
Historic house museums in New York (state)
Houses on the National Register of Historic Places in New York (state)
Houses completed in 1725
Historical society museums in New York (state)
Houses in Suffolk County, New York
1725 establishments in the Province of New York
National Register of Historic Places in Suffolk County, New York